The 1983–84 UNLV Runnin' Rebels basketball team represented the University of Nevada Las Vegas in NCAA Division I men's competition in the 1983–84 season under head coach Jerry Tarkanian. The team played its home games in the Thomas & Mack Center, and was a member of the Pacific Coast Athletic Association (PCAA), now known as the Big West Conference. The Rebels won the regular season conference title, but fell to Fresno State in the championship game of the PCAA Tournament. The team finished with a record of 29–6 (16–2 PCAA).

Roster

Schedule and results

|-
!colspan=12 style=| Regular season

|-
!colspan=12 style=| PCAA tournament

|-
!colspan=12 style=| NCAA tournament

Rankings

Awards and honors
Richie Adams – PCAA Player of the Year

See also
UNLV Runnin' Rebels basketball
1984 NCAA Division I men's basketball tournament

References

Unlv
UNLV Runnin' Rebels basketball seasons
Unlv
UNLV Runnin' Rebels basketball team
UNLV Runnin' Rebels basketball team